Poshteh Konji (also Romanized as Poshteh Konjī) is a village in Ahmadi Rural District, Ahmadi District, Hajjiabad County, Hormozgan Province, Iran. At the 2006 census, its population was 231, in 50 families.

References 

Populated places in Hajjiabad County